Israel-Nachrichten (meaning "Israel news") was a German language daily newspaper published in Tel Aviv.

The paper was founded in October 1935 by Siegfried Blumenthal, a Jewish merchant from Berlin. By 1950 it was one of the best selling newspapers in Israel.

Initially it was called S. Blumenthal's Private Correspondenz (1935-1936), then Blumenthal's Neuste Nachrichten (1937-1943), then Neuste Nachrichten (1943-1973). In Hebrew it was known as "Yediot Hadashot."  The content was in German except for a period in 1948 when part of the content was in Hebrew. 1974 it was sold to a large publishing company. From now on it was called Israel Nachrichten (Chadashoth Israel).

The 100,000 German-speaking Jews in Israel and German-speaking Jews worldwide were the target readership.

From 1975 until 2007, the editor-in-chief was Alice Schwarz-Gardos. She was the oldest editor-in-chief of a newspaper worldwide (born 31 August 1916 in Vienna).

Due to financial reasons, the paper was discontinued in January 2011.

1935 establishments in Mandatory Palestine
Ashkenazi Jewish culture in Tel Aviv
German-Jewish culture in Israel
Daily newspapers published in Israel
Non-Hebrew-language mass media in Israel
Mass media in Tel Aviv
Defunct newspapers published in Israel
Newspapers published in Mandatory Palestine
2011 disestablishments in Israel